Cliniodes vinacea is a moth in the family Crambidae. It was described by Eugene G. Munroe in 1964. It is found in the Andes from Colombia to central Bolivia. It is also found in northern Venezuela.

The length of the forewings is 15–18 mm for males and 15–17 mm for females. The forewing costa is yellow orange and the basal area is brownish red/violet with black scales on the anal area. The medial area has dark brownish red/violet scales with orange bases and the medial, postmedial and terminal areas are dark glossy grey. The hindwings are translucent white and black marginal band. Adults have been recorded on wing year round.

References

Moths described in 1964
Eurrhypini